Roberto Carlos Juárez Gutiérrez  (born July 4, 1984 in Puebla, Mexico) is a Mexican footballer. He currently plays for Puebla F.C. in the Liga MX. He surged out of Cruz Azul's youth squad.

Career
Juárez began his career in 2007 with Cruz Azul. He made his debut on November 17, 2007 in a match against Pachuca.

Footnotes

 

1984 births
Living people
Mexican footballers
Club Puebla players
Querétaro F.C. footballers
Liga MX players
Cruz Azul footballers
Association football defenders